Francisco Acebras Hochstrasse (born 1976) is a Mexican race car driver.

In 2001, Hochstrasse drove for the DJS team in the Formula Chrysler Euroseries.

References

1976 births
Living people
Mexican racing drivers
Mexican people of German descent
Place of birth missing (living people)
Date of birth missing (living people)
21st-century Mexican people